Bolasodun Adesumbo "Bola" Ajibola,  (born 22 March 1934) is a Nigerian jurist, he was Attorney General and the Minister of Justice of Nigeria from 1985 to 1991 and a Judge of the International Court of Justice from 1991 to 1994. He was president of the Nigerian Bar Association from 1984 to 1985. He was also one of five commissioners on the Eritrea-Ethiopia Boundary Commission, organized through the Permanent Court of Arbitration.

He is a Prince from Owu and was born on 22 March 1934 in Owu, near Abeokuta, Colonial Nigeria, to the Owu royal family of Oba Abdul-Salam Ajibola Gbadela II, who was the traditional ruler of Owu between 1949 and 1972. Ajibola attended both Owu Baptist Day School and Baptist Boys' High School in Abeokuta between 1942 and 1955. He obtained his bachelor's degree in Law (LL.B) at the Holborn College of Law, University of London between 1959 and 1962 and was called to the English Bar at the Lincoln's Inn in 1962. He returned to Nigeria to practise Law, specialising in Commercial Law and International Arbitration.

Prince Bola Ajibola was chairman of the panel set up by the Plateau State government to probe the 2008 Jos riots. He established an Islamic and co-educational institution, Crescent University, in Nigeria in 2005, and he serves as the Chairman of the Board of Trustees of Muslim Ummah of South West Nigeria (MUSWEN).

He was the High Commissioner of Nigeria to the United Kingdom from 1999 to 2002.

Posts and membership of professional associations 

 President, Nigerian Bar Association (1984-1985)
 President, The World Association of Judges
 Chairman, Disciplinary Committee of the Bar and General Council of the Bar
 Chairman, Body of Senior Advocates of Nigeria
 Member, Advisory Judicial Committee
 Member, African Bar Association
 IBA
 Association of World Lawyers
 Commonwealth Law Association
 Vice President, Institute of International Business Law and Practice, Paris 

 Vice-Chairman, International Court of Justice, The Hague (1991-1994)
 President, World Bank Administrative Tribunal
 Judge, Constitution Court of Bosnia and Herzegovina (1994-2002)
 Member, the International Centre for Settlement of Investment Disputes (ICSID)
 Member, Permanent Court of Arbitration
 Fellow, Chartered Institute of Arbitrators, London
 Chairman, Cameroon-Nigeria Mixed Commission
 Arbitrator/Commissioner, Eritrea/Ethiopia Boundary Commission

Bola Ajibola was the editor of Nigeria's Treaties in Force from 1970 to 1990 and All-Nigeria Law Reports from 1961 to 1990. He has authored many books including 'Heavens in View', and various papers and articles on a range of legal subjects.

Personal life 
He was married to Olufunmilayo Janet Abeni Ajibola, who died in London 8 June 2016

References

https://web.archive.org/web/20101220125953/http://thenationonlineng.net/web2/articles/225/1/Bola-Ajibola-An-icon-at-75/Page1.html
GoogleSearch

1934 births
Justice ministers of Nigeria
International Court of Justice judges
Living people
Government ministers of Nigeria
People from Ogun State
Alumni of University of London Worldwide
Alumni of the University of London
20th-century Nigerian lawyers
Yoruba legal professionals
Yoruba royalty
Attorneys General of Nigeria
Nigerian judges of United Nations courts and tribunals